NVS may refer to:

Technology 
Non-volatile storage (NVS) or Non-volatile memory (NVM) is a type of computer memory
NVS Telematic System Ltd is a Russian company that builds technology and equipment controlled by signals from satellite navigation systems
 NVSwitch is a successor of the Nvidia DGX-1 servers and workstations
 A line of business graphics cards from Nvidia, see Nvidia Quadro#For business NVS

Education 
Institutionen for Neurobiologi, vardvetenskap och samhalle (NVS) (en. Dep of Neurobiology, Care Sciences and Society), a department of Karolinska Institutet in Sweden
Jawahar Navodaya Vidyalaya (JNVs), are schools in India that are run by Navodaya Vidyalaya Samiti (NVS)
New Village School (NVS), a school in Sausalito, California, USA

Other uses 
NVS and NOVN, the Swiss multinational pharmaceutical company Novartis is traded as NVS and NOVN

See also 
 NV (disambiguation)